A is a 1965 short film animated by Jan Lenica.

Summary
It involves a writer tormented by a giant letter "A". He frees himself from the "A" only to encounter a "B".

Background
It began production in late 1965 and premiered at the Oberhausen Film Festival in February 1965. The film was considered lost until it was found as a part of a 1973 episode of Screening Room  and uploaded to YouTube in 2016.

References

External links

1965 films
West German films
German animated short films
1960s French-language films
1965 animated films
1960s animated short films
1965 short films
1960s rediscovered films
Rediscovered German films
1960s German films